Discoverytrema is a genus of trematodes in the family Opecoelidae. K. Zdzitowiecki described both species of Discoverytrema as being endoparasitic in the Antarctic gadiform fish Muraenolepis microps Lönnberg, 1905, which are found to the south of the British South Georgia Island.

Species
Discoverytrema gibsoni Zdzitowiecki, 1990
Discoverytrema markowskii Gibson, 1976

References

Opecoelidae
Plagiorchiida genera